Portcullis House (PCH) is an office building in Westminster, London, United Kingdom, that was commissioned in 1992 and opened in 2001 to provide offices for 213 members of parliament and their staff. The public entrance is on the Embankment. Part of the Parliamentary Estate, the building augments limited space in the Palace of Westminster and surroundings.

History and use 

The architects, Michael Hopkins and Partners, published their design in 1993 and the existing buildings on the site were demolished in 1994. At the same time, the London Underground was building the Jubilee Line Extension, including a new interchange station at Westminster tube station which occupies the same area; the two were thus designed and built as a single unit. Construction began with works to the existing District line station at sub-basement level. The track had to be lowered slightly and underpinned to allow the extensive excavation to the Jubilee line many feet below. The building above ground began to rise in 1998 and opened in 2001. It is located at the corner of Bridge Street (at the western end of Westminster Bridge) and Victoria Embankment – overlooking the River Thames – and adjacent to the Norman Shaw South Building, which also overlooks the river.

The building is named after the chained portcullis used to symbolize the Houses of Parliament on letterheads and official documents. Portcullis House accommodates about one third of members of parliament; other Members and Parliamentary departments have offices in the two Norman Shaw Buildings (formerly known as Scotland Yard), in the buildings at 1 Parliament Street and at 7 Millbank, and in the Palace of Westminster itself.

The first floor of Portcullis House is open to members of the public to allow attendance at Committee sessions. Throughout the rest of the building, as with the rest of the Parliamentary Estate, members of the public must remain with a passholder. The entrance is guarded by police, and all visitors must submit their bags and coats for X-raying, as well as passing through a metal detector and undergoing a body check.  There is a Post Office branch within Portcullis House that is not open to the public.

Design 

The building was designed by Michael Hopkins and Partners and incorporates Westminster tube station below it. A thick slab of concrete separates Portcullis House from the station, reportedly to defend against any underground bomb attacks. The load is borne by the walls, without interior posts. The corners of the building are hung from the roof using massive steel beams . The design life of 120 years meant that aluminium bronze was chosen for exposed metal on the roof and walls. The structure also includes Devonian granite and was the last consignment to be excavated at Merrivale Quarry on Dartmoor. The columns between the windows are constructed of Birchover Gritstone.

The building's curious profile, with its rows of tall chimneys, is intended to recall the Victorian Gothic design of the Palace of Westminster and to fit in with the chimneys of the Norman Shaw Building next door. Portcullis House's chimneys are not used to expel fumes but are part of an unpowered air conditioning system, which is designed to draw air through the building by exploiting natural convection flows. It is based on the system used in 1996 in the Eastgate Centre, Harare, Zimbabwe.

The building itself was designed to look and feel like a ship inside. All the offices and passages are made up with bowed windows and light oak finishing. Each floor looks identical to the others except the ground floor which houses the main courtyard with ship-like metallic sails suspended overhead. The courtyard is decorated with trees and two shallow baths of water.

The offices at Portcullis House are generally in sets of two sharing a common bay in the centre. Each floor is unofficially allocated to a different political party so that generally MPs with similar politics are kept together. The first floor houses a number of conference suites and committee rooms, which are named after famous politicians Betty Boothroyd, Harold Macmillan, Margaret Thatcher, Clement Attlee, Harold Wilson, and Jo Grimond. These Committee rooms are accessible to the public and are fitted with television cameras and microphones, to broadcast the proceedings via BBC Parliament and via parliamentlive.tv.

All rooms in the building are fitted with annunciators (monitors which announce in real-time the current business in the Chambers of the House of Commons, the House of Lords, or both). Division bells are also installed throughout the building, which alert MPs to the calling of a division (vote) in the Chamber of the House of Commons. Along with this, visual aids (a flashing image of a bell) are displayed on television sets and computer desktops in MPs' offices when the Division bell sounds.

On the ground floor are a range of services including a waiter-service restaurant ("The Adjournment"), informal cafeteria ("The Debate") and a coffee shop ("The Despatch Box"), available only to pass holders and their guests. There is also a post office and an e-library, an enquiry point where Members and staff can use networked computers, run by the House of Commons Library. There is also an underground passage into the Palace of Westminster and a connection to the 1 Parliament Street building and to the Norman Shaw Buildings. For security reasons this is now the main route of access for Parliament.

Cost 
When commissioned in 1992 the cost of Portcullis House was to be £165m. After building cost inflation and delays, the price increased to £235m. Costs included £150,000 for decorative fig trees, £2m for electric blinds and, for each MP, a reclining chair at £440. A parliamentary inquiry into the over-spend was carried by Sir Thomas Legg. Although completed in 2000, the report was never published. By April 2012 the fig trees, which were rented, had cost almost £400,000.

See also 
 Parliament of the United Kingdom

Footnotes

References

External links 
Portcullis House on the UK Parliament website

 Portcullis House, London, Michael Hopkins 2001, galinsky
 Inside Portcullis House, Ben Davies BBC News 2001-11-15

2001 establishments in England
Buildings and structures in the City of Westminster
Buildings and structures on the River Thames
Buildings by Hopkins Architects
Government buildings completed in 2001
National government buildings in London
Office buildings completed in 2001
Parliamentary Estate
Postmodern architecture in the United Kingdom